Mstislaw Voivodeship or Mścisław Voivodeship was a unit of administrative division and local government in the Grand Duchy of Lithuania (from 1569 the Polish–Lithuanian Commonwealth), since the 15th century until the Partitions of Poland in 1795.

Zygmunt Gloger in his monumental book Historical Geography of the Lands of Old Poland provides this description of the Mscislaw Voivodeship:

“Mscislaw (Mscislavia), which lies at the Wiechra river, was probably founded in the late 13th century, and named after Duke of Smolensk, Mstislav Romanovich the Old. In the 14th century, it was captured by the Grand Duchy of Lithuania, and for a while remained a fief (...) By 1538, the Duchy of Mscislaw was already governed by a starosta, who during the reign of King Zygmunt August was renamed into a voivode, while the Duchy was turned into a voivodeship. First Voivode of Mscislaw was Jerzy Oscik, Traby coat of arms. 

The Voivodeship of Mscislaw was not divided into counties (see powiat). Its sejmiks took place at Mscislaw, where two deputies to the Sejm were elected, and two to the Lithuanian Tribunal (...) It ceased to exist in 1772, when after the first partition of Poland, Mscislaw Voivodeship was annexed by the Russian Empire".

Voivodeship Governor (Wojewoda) seat: 
 Mscislaw

Voivodes 
 Janusz Skumin Tyszkiewicz (1621-1626) 
 Mikołaj Kiszka (1626-1636)
 Mikołaj Abramowicz (1643-1647)
 Fryderyk Sapieha (VIII 1647-1650)

Administrative division 
 the voivodeship was not divided into counties

References
 Mscislaw Voivodeship, description by Zygmunt Gloger

Voivodeships of the Polish–Lithuanian Commonwealth
Former voivodeships of Grand Duchy of Lithuania
1566 establishments in Europe
1566 establishments in Lithuania
1772 disestablishments in the Polish–Lithuanian Commonwealth
Early Modern history of Belarus